Ingrid Coronado Fritz (born July 12, 1974 in Mexico City, Mexico) is a Mexican television personality.

Early life
As a child, she took singing, ballet, piano and acting lessons. Later on, she developed her artistic career performing as a singer and TV host.

Career
She took part as a back-up vocalist in recordings for Timbiriche, TVO, Chabelo, Denise de Kalafe, among others. She also performed as a host at festivals in Acapulco and at the Univision show Control.

A great opportunity came in 1994 when she joined the group Garibaldi, replacing Patricia Manterola. During this time Ingrid got involved in a relationship with Charly López and gave birth to her first child, Emiliano. They broke up at the end of 1998.

Afterwards she joined the show Tempranito, for entertainment section. She began to acquire more spaces within the show until she became one of the main hosts.
Later on she became the host of the contest show Sexos en guerra, together with Fernando del Solar, where she had a chance to exploit her talent to the fullest. Currently she continues to work in Mexican TV as the host of the show Venga la alegría.

Personal life
On May 13, 2008 Ingrid announced her engagement to Argentine entertainer Fernando del Solar. The relationship was confirmed by the couple during the live transmission of Venga La alegria show where she confirmed that she was pregnant with Fernando's child. She has now two kids with him. Ingrid is the TV host of La Academia season 7, 8, 9 and 10, La Academia Kids season 1 and 2, Soy tu doble and Soy tu doble VIP projects of TV Azteca.

Del Solar was in 2012 diagnosed with cancer.

TV work 
Tempranito (1998) 
Sexos en guerra (2002) 
Venga la alegría (2006–2009)  
La Nueva Academia (2009)
La Academia Bicentenario (2010)
La Academia 2011 (2011)
Soy tu doble (2012)
La Academia 10 años (2012) 
La Academia Kids Lala (2013)
Soy tu doble VIP (2014)
La Academia Kids 2 (2014)

References

External links

Ingrid Coronado at TV Azteca Page (Spanish)
Official website of Íngrid Coronado

Living people
1974 births
People from Mexico City
Mexican television talk show hosts
Mexican people of German descent